Henchir-Aïn-Dourat, also known as Ad-Duwayrat or Henchir Durat, is a former Roman–Berber civitas and archaeological site in Tunisia. It is located at 36.767496n, 9.524142e, in the hills just north of Toukabeur and 15.3 km from Majāz al Bāb. It was an ancient Catholic diocese.

History
The ruins have been identified as the remains of Uccula a municipium of the province of Africa Proconsularis during the Roman Empire, and which was active from 330 BC – AD 640.  The ruins at Henchir-Aïn-Dourat have been surveyed, and include a statue of mars. An inscription in the ruins honors Constantine as "beyond the other emperors" and "unconquered". and another earlier in its history  honours Divus Titus.

Before the Romans the town  was in the tribal area of the Afri, a Berber confederation.

The civitas was also the seat of an ancient Christian bishopric, which survives today as a titular see of the Roman Catholic Church.

References

Archaeological sites in Tunisia
Roman towns and cities in Tunisia
Ancient Berber cities
Catholic titular sees in Africa
Former Roman Catholic dioceses in Africa